The Archdeacon of Ludlow is a senior ecclesiastical officer within the Diocese of Hereford. Prior to 1876 the post was known by its previous title of Archdeacon of Shropshire or alternatively as the Archdeacon of Salop in the Diocese of Hereford.

History
Shropshire was historically split between the diocese of Hereford (under the Archdeacon of Shropshire) and the diocese of Coventry and Lichfield (under the Archdeacon of Salop). The Shropshire archdeaconry in the Hereford diocese included the deaneries of Burford, Stottesdon, Ludlow, Pontesbury, Clun Forest and Wenlock and the Salop archdeaconry in the Coventry and Lichfield diocese the deaneries of Salop and Newport. On 4 April 1876, the archdeaconry of Shropshire became the archdeaconry of Ludlow, with the additional deaneries of Bridgnorth (added in 1535), Montgomery, Bishops Castle, Condover, and Church Stretton.

The Archdeacon is responsible for the disciplinary supervision of the clergy  within the six current area deaneries: Bridgnorth, Clun Forest, Condover, Ludlow, Pontesbury and Telford Severn Gorge.

The post is currently vacant following the retirement of Alistair Magowan, Bishop suffragan of Ludlow. His two predecessors as Archdeacon of Ludlow were also Bishops of Ludlow. It was announced by the diocese in July 2020 that Magowan's successor is to be full-time Archdeacon only.

List of archdeacons

Until 1876, the archdeacons were known as Archdeacons of Shropshire ( Salop).

High Medieval
bef. 1086–aft. 1108: William
bef. 1148–aft. 1148: Peter le Kauf
bef. 1148–aft. 1144: Odo
bef. 1163–14 August 1178 (d.): Walter Foliot
bef. 1186–1219 (res.): Hugh Foliot
bef. 1223–aft. 1219 (d.): Nicholas of Hampton/Wolverhampton
bef. 1227–18 July 1240 (d.): Simon of Edenbridge
August 1240: Peter of Aigueblanche (quickly elected bishop)
bef. 1241–aft. 1243: John Foliot
bef. 1253–aft. 1258 (deprived): James of Aigueblanche (deprived)
bef. 1271–aft. 1271: Hervey of Boreham
17 April 1276–bef. 1287 (d.): Richard de Swinfield
bef. 1277–1280: James of Aigueblanche (again)
1280–bef. 1287 (d.): Adam de Fileby
6 September 1287 – 1 August 1289 (res.): John de Bestan
20 October 1289 – 21 March 1293 (res.): John de Swinfield
21 March 1293 – 15 January 1300 (res.): Roger de Canterbury
27 January 1300–aft. 1303: Philip Talbot

Late Medieval
bef. 1309–1318 (res.): John de Rosse
1318–aft. 1326: William (son of Thomas le Mercer of Rosse)
12 January 1333–bef. 1346: Richard de Sydenhale
aft. 1346–1366 (exch.): Henry de Shipton
1366–11 September (or December) 1367 (exch.): William de Borstall
11 September (or December) 1367–aft. 1376: Richard Nowell
bef. 1386–24 July 1410 (exch.): John Hore
24 July 1410–bef. 1410 (d.): John Wells
27 October 1410 – 5 (or 31) May 1417 (exch.): John Hereford (afterwards Archdeacon of Hereford)
5 (or 31) May 1417 – 21 July 1422 (exch.): John Loveney (previously Archdeacon of Hereford)
21 July 1422–bef. 1425: John Merbury
7 April 1425–bef. 1441 (d.): William Laches
28 June 1441 – 24 March 1472 (exch.): Thomas Yone
24 March 1472–bef. 1485 (res.): Robert Geffrey/Jeffry (afterwards Archdeacon of Hereford)
bef. 1485– (res.): Thomas Morton (afterwards Archdeacon of Hereford)
–bef. 1504 (d.): John Martyn
31 October 1504 – 1511 (res.): William Webb/Webbe (afterwards Archdeacon of Hereford)
29 July 1511–bef. 1512: Arthur Stafford
bef. 1512–bef. 1515 (d.): John Wardroper
27 July 1515–bef. 1516 (d.): William Goberd
3 March 1516–bef. 1524 (d.): Henry Martyn
28 January 1524–bef. 1537 (res.): Humphrey Ogle
14 August 1537 – 1557 (res.): Richard Sparcheford

Early modern
23 December 1560–bef. 1561: Nicholas Smith/Richard Smythe
20 October 1561 – 1579 (d.): Robert Grensill
30 (or 28) March 1580–bef. 1631: Robert Greenwiche
24 April 1631–aft. 1644 (d.): Morgan Godwin
24 September 1660 – 6 April 1669 (d.): Thomas Cooke
8 May 1669 – 20 August 1684 (d.): Stephen Philips
25 August 1684–December 1686 (d.): Francis Wheeler
5 January 1687 – 1713 (res.): Adam Ottley
18 July 1713–bef. 1727 (d.): Robert Comyn
24 January 1727–bef. 1732 (d.): Richard Crosse
1 July 1732–bef. 1738 (res.): Samuel Croxall
6 May 1738–bef. 1741 (res.): Robert Breton
1 January 1741–bef. 1760 (d.): Egerton Leigh (whose son Egerton was later Archdeacon of Salop in Lichfield diocese)
11 February 1760–bef. 1769 (res.): John Harley
2 February 1769–bef. 1792 (d.): Robert Clive
4 August 1792 – 1830: Joseph Plymley (surnamed Corbett after 1804)
1830–1851 (d.): William Vickers
16 August 1851–1876: William Waring (became Archdeacon of Ludlow)
On 4 April 1876, the archdeaconry who renamed Ludlow.

Archdeacons of Ludlow
1876–bef. 1877 (d.): William Waring (previously Archdeacon of Shropshire)
17 March 1877–bef. 1892 (res.): George Maddison
4 January 1892–aft. 1902 (res.): Henry Bather
1904–1913 (res.): Algernon Oldham
1913–1928 (ret.): Alfred Lilley
1928–1932 (res.): Edwin Bartleet
1932–28 July 1939 (d.): Henry Dixon
1939–7 December 1947 (d.): Herbert Whately
1948–1960 (res.): Hugh Bevan (afterwards archdeacon emeritus)
1960–1970 (res.): John Lewis (afterwards Archdeacon of Hereford)
1970–1982 (ret.): Andrew Woodhouse (afterwards Archdeacon of Hereford)
1982–1983 (ret.): Mark Wood, Bishop suffragan of Ludlow
1984–1987 (res.): Ian Griggs (afterwards Bishop suffragan of Ludlow)
1987–1992 (res.): Richard Lewis
1992–2001 (res.): John Saxbee (also Bishop suffragan of Ludlow from 1994)
2002–2009 (ret.): Michael Hooper, Bishop suffragan of Ludlow
200930 April 2020 (ret.): Alistair Magowan, Bishop suffragan of Ludlow
26 April 2021present: Fiona Gibson

Notes

References

Sources

Melocki – Archdeaconry of Salop (Accessed 12 December 2013)

Anglican ecclesiastical offices
Lists of Anglicans
Lists of English people
Diocese of Hereford